The horned grebe or Slavonian grebe (Podiceps auritus) is a relatively small waterbird in the family Podicipedidae. There are two known subspecies: P. a. auritus, which breeds in the Palearctic, and P. a. cornutus, which breeds in North America. The Eurasian subspecies is distributed over most of northern Europe and the Palearctic, breeding from Greenland to western China. The North American subspecies spans most of Canada and some of the United States. The species got its name from large patches of yellowish feathers located behind the eyes, called "horns", that the birds can raise and lower at will.

Description
Horned grebes can be easily recognised by its red-and-black alternate (breeding) plumage, its black-and-white basic (non-breeding) plumage, and its characteristic "horns". It is 31–38 cm long, has a wingspan 55–74 cm wide and weighs 300–570 g. It has a moderately long neck, flat forehead and a rear crown of black feathers. Its beak is straight and pointy with a white tip. Both subspecies are physically similar, with P. a. auritus (Palearctic) appearing darker than P. a. cornutus (North America), which has light grey feathers on its back, which are inconspicuous or absent in P. a. auritus. The horned grebe is often confused with the black-necked grebe, which is similar in size and colouring but differentiates by a steeper forehead, a more slender bill and a fluffier rump.

The alternate (breeding) plumage of the horned grebe has bright erectable "horns", black fan-shaped cheek feathers and an overall red-and-black colour. The neck, flanks, lores and upper-chest are chestnut brown, while the crown and back are black. The belly is a dull white. Males are slightly larger and brighter than females but are generally indistinguishable.

The basic (non-breeding) plumage is overall black and white. The neck, chest and cheeks are white, while the back and crown are a dull black-grey. The border between the crown and the cheeks extend in a straight line behind the eyes. The basic plumage does not have the "horns".

Juveniles appear similar to a non-breeding adult except they are a slightly duller shade of white and their back is tinged with brown. The line separating the cheeks and crown is less distinct and their beak is paler. The chicks are fluffy, with a dull grey back, a white belly and interesting black-and-white facial striping.

Taxonomy

Subspecies
P. a. auritus, (Linnaeus, 1758), temperate Eurasia
P. a. cornutus, (Gmelin, 1789), North America

Related species
 Black-necked grebe (Podiceps nigricollis) 
 Red-necked grebe (Podiceps grisegena)
 Great crested grebe (Podiceps cristatus)

Paleontology
A handful of fossil species, such as the Pliocene aged P. howardae, P. pisanus and P. solidus, and the Pleistocene aged P. dixi have been described to be related to or perhaps some of them might be pre-Holocene material of the horned grebe. However while P. howardae and P. dixi are regularly recognized as fossil material of the horned grebe by some authors, P. pisanus and P. solidus are argued to be valid species that are close to the ancestry of the horned grebe.

Distribution and habitat 
The horned grebe is distributed in Eurasia and North America. In Eurasia, it breeds in a few isolated locations in Greenland (uncommon), Iceland, Scotland and northwestern Norway, while extensively from southeastern Norway to western China. It winters along the coasts of Iceland, Norway and the British Isles down towards the Mediterranean, the Black Sea and the Caspian Sea. In eastern Asia, the horned grebe winters along the coasts of China, Korea and Japan.

In North America, it is restricted to the northwestern region of the continent, with 92% of its distribution located in Canada. The total North American range spans from south-central Alaska to northwestern Ontario. It breeds as far north as the Yukon and southern Nunavut to northwestern states, from Washington to Minnesota. Additionally, there is a small population who breed annually on the Magdalene Islands of Quebec. Its wintering range is also primarily coastal from southern Alaska down to the northern Gulf of California. Its eastern overwintering range is from southern Nova Scotia, down to the Florida Keys and sometimes west to Texas.

Horned grebes breed primarily in temperate zones, including prairies and parklands, but are also seen in boreal and subarctic regions. They breed in small to moderately sized (0.5-10 ha) shallow freshwater ponds, marshes and shallow bays on lake edges with beds of emergent vegetation. They prefer areas with sedges, rushes, and cattails along with large areas of open water. This habitat provides a suitable site for nest material, anchorage, concealment and protection for young.

During migration, they will stop along lakes, rivers and marshes. Following migration, they winter in marine environments of estuaries and bays or inland on large lakes, although in Norway, large concentrations congregate on inland lakes.

Behaviour

Vocalisation 
Young begin calling for begging purposes in a slightly trilled peeping noise, similar to that of a domestic chick. As they mature, their song changes to a more adult-like chittering. Their typical advertising call is loud and nasally "aaarrh" descending in a pitch and ending in a trill. They use other calls during copulation, alarm and breeding ceremonies that are slightly variable from the advertising call. Horned grebes are extremely vocal during breeding, territory establishment and defence. Their song is subdued during autumn migration and at wintering sites.

Diet 
Horned grebes dive underwater using their large feet for agile manoeuvrability to feed on aquatic arthropods, fish and crustaceans. They will also catch airborne insects on the water's surface. Underwater they swallow or capture large prey and re-emerging at the surface to manipulate the fish headfirst. They usually feed solitarily or in small groups of up to 5 individuals. During the summer, aquatic and airborne arthropods are preferred, whereas winter selection favours fish and crustaceans.

The horned grebe has a unique adaptation for swallowing fish whole. They will eat their own feathers from a young age, so that their stomach has a matted plug that functions as a filter to hold fish bones until digestion.

Reproduction 

Horned grebes are monogamous and develop their relationship through elaborate mating routines. There are four pair bonding ceremonies; discovery ceremony, weed ceremony, head-shaking ceremony and triumph ceremony. The discovery ceremony begins with advertising displays, which include an upright posture, erect "horns" and sounding of their advertising call. Then, both male and female engage in bouts of penguin dance and preening. This initial pair bonding ceremony is to ensure correct species identification, sex and compatibility. The weed ceremony follows the completion of a successful discovery ceremony. The male and female will dive, retrieve weeds and rise in synchronisation. The pair will come breast-to-breast with their weeds then turn side by side to continue swimming. This weed-rush can continue multiple times until both individuals are satisfied. Finally, the head-shaking ceremony and triumph ceremony are performed for primarily established pairs. Once copulation is to take place, it always occurs on a platform nest built by the pair.

Horned grebes usually arrive at breeding grounds in pairs or solitarily to seek out a mate, between April and August. Within a typical breeding colony there are approximately 20 breeding pairs, who nest solitarily. During nesting, horned grebes are known to defend their nests very aggressively. Those nests are built from plant matter and are most commonly affixed to emergent vegetation otherwise built on land or in shallow open water. In June, females lay a single clutch of three to eight eggs, which are coloured white, brownish or blueish green. These eggs measure  on average. Both males and females share incubation time for 22 to 25 days. When the young hatch, they can swim and dive within the first few days, although they must be kept warm by their parents for up to 14 days. During this time, the juvenile chicks can often be seen riding on the backs of their swimming parents right in-between the wing and the back. Later the horned grebe will take their first flight at 55–60 days old. The species finally reaches sexual maturity at 2 years old.

Population trends 
The total western population is estimated at between 200,000 and 500,000 individuals and the Eurasian population at 12,900 to 18,500 mature individuals. The global population has declined by 30% over the last three decades and by 79% within North America. This is due primarily to human disturbance, forestry operations around breeding sites, fluctuating water levels, and stocking of lakes with rainbow trout that compete for aquatic insects. They are also frequently caught in nets, vulnerable to oil spills and diseases. Between 1985 and 2001, grassland and wetland drainage amounted to 5% global habitat loss. The Canadian western population is listed as being of special concern and the breeding population on Magdalene Islands is listed as endangered. Due to global declines, the International Union for Conservation of Nature has uplisted the horned grebe's status from least concern to vulnerable, resulting in conservation and research action plans.

References

External links 
 https://web.archive.org/web/20161019025539/http://www.arkive.org/horned-grebe/podiceps-auritus/video-09b.html Video of the horned grebe mating display.
 https://www.allaboutbirds.org/guide/Horned_Grebe/sounds Sounds of the horned grebe: call, pair bonding, adults with chicks, chick calls and copulation calls.

horned grebe
Holarctic birds
horned grebe
horned grebe